The American Association of Teachers of Slavic and East European Languages (AATSEEL) is an academic organization founded in 1941. AATSEEL holds an annual conference each January and publishes the Slavic and East European Journal (SEEJ), a peer-reviewed journal of Slavic studies.

See also
 Association for Slavic, East European, and Eurasian Studies (ASEEES)
 American Council of Teachers of Russian (ACTR)

References

External links
 AATSEEL Official web site

Academic organizations based in the United States
Linguistics organizations
1941 establishments in the United States
Organizations established in 1941